Pingdeng is a town in Longsheng Various Nationalities Autonomous County, Guangxi, China.

Administrative division
As of 2016, the town is divided into twenty-one villages and one community:
 Pingdeng Community
 Paotian
 Guangnan
 Pingdeng
 Longping
 Banhe
 Xinyuan
 Gudong
 Mengdong
 Zhaizhen
 Pingdeng
 Yingzhou
 Luohan
 Xiaojiang
 Chengtian
 Taiping
 Ping'an
 Jiahe
 Liuli
 Dongshe
 Changbei
 Longjiang

History
The town was historically known as "Pengteng" in Kam language. It was named "Pingdeng" in Chinese language. In early Republic of China, the Chinese character "", was changed to "" of the same pronunciation.

In 2014 it was upgraded to a town.

Geography
The town is situated at northwestern Longsheng Various Nationalities Autonomous County. The town is bordered to the north by Chengbu Miao Autonomous County, to the east by Weijiang Township, to the south by Lejiang Town, and to the west by Tongdao Dong Autonomous County.

The Xun River flows north to south through the town.

Economy
The local economy is primarily based upon agriculture and local industry.

References

Bibliography

Towns of Guilin